Wark in Tyndale Castle was a medieval building in the English county of Northumberland. It was first mentioned in 1399–1400, but a motte and bailey castle occupied the site since the 12th century.

References
Notes

Bibliography

Castles in Northumberland
History of Northumberland